The sport of football in the country of Kyrgyzstan is run by the Football Federation of Kyrgyz Republic. The association administers the national football team as well as the Kyrgyzstan League. Football is the most popular sport in the country.

National team

Kyrgyzstan is a minor Asian football nation.

Kyrgyzstan qualified for the Asian Cup in 2019 AFC Asian Cup.

References